Gonystylus consanguineus is a species of plant in the Thymelaeaceae family. It is found in Indonesia and Malaysia.

References

consanguineus
Vulnerable plants
Taxonomy articles created by Polbot